is a Japanese drama series aired in Japan on Fuji TV in 2002.  It stars Yūko Takeuchi, Yōsuke Eguchi, Satoshi Tsumabuki, and Shinichi Tsutsumi.

Synopsis
Season 1 (2002)

Natsumi loves lunchtime and food.  Nothing excites her more than to walk down the street thinking about where she'll eat lunch.  One day, a man named Kennichiro interrupts Natsumi as she's about to eat her favorite rice omelet and drags her outside and begs her to come home with him so that he can introduce her to his family.  He explains to her that his father is sick and after leaving on bad terms, the only way he'll be allowed back home is to return with a fiancée.  Natsumi is left with quite a predicament.

Cast
Season 1 (2002)

Main

Minor

Episodes

Season One (2002)

The ratings are sourced from Video Research Ltd. Rating in red is the highest and in blue is the lowest.

Awards and nominations

References

External links
 Lunch no Joou (ランチの女王) at JDorama

2002 Japanese television series debuts
2002 Japanese television series endings
Japanese drama television series
Fuji TV dramas